REM Island is a platform built in the Republic of Ireland and towed off the Dutch coast in 1964 as the pirate broadcasting home of Radio and TV Noordzee. Both stations were dismantled by the Netherlands Armed Forces. It was 10 km off Noordwijk.

Construction and foundation

Radio and TV Noordzee was founded in 1963 with land-based offices and broadcast from the sea. The artificial island was built in the harbour of Cork, Ireland. It was towed to its location and anchored in cement on the seabed. On 12 August 1964 a test broadcast was performed and on 15 August regular broadcasting started. The radio service broadcast on 1400 kHz, while on television it used Channel E11 (System B).

REM stands for Reclame Exploitatie Maatschappij ("advertising exploitation company"). The company intended to broadcast commercial radio and TV. Dutch law at the time did not authorise such broadcasts but the island was outside territorial waters. Other stations, such as Radio Veronica, used a ship.

Raid 

While Dutch authorities were unhappy with the broadcasts, they did not possess the legal right to stop them. However, on the 12 of December, 1964, the government passed the REM law, which split the North Sea into continental sections. The sea bed under REM Island, to which the structure was attached, was therefore declared Dutch territory. Five days later, Korps Mariniers boarded the platform and ended broadcasting.

Later use and dismantling

A year after the raid, Radio Noordzee resumed transmissions legally under the name TROS. After that REM Island was used by the government to measure sea temperature and salt concentration. After a failed attempt to sell the island in 2004, the government dismantled it with a goodbye radio event by amateur radio enthusiasts, with the callsign PB6REM on the platform on 8 June 2006.

Since March 2011 the platform sits in Amsterdam harbour where it serves as a restaurant.

References

External links 

Artificial islands of the Netherlands
Offshore radio
Radio masts and towers in Europe
Towers in the Netherlands